Mimi Jones (born March 25, 1972 in New York City) is an American bassist, vocalist, composer, bandleader, education and founder of Hot Tone Music.

Background
Mimi Jones was born Miriam Sullivan in New York City and was raised in the Bronx. She attended The Harlem School of the Arts, Fiorello H. LaGuardia High School and graduated with a Bachelor of Music Performance from the Manhattan School of Music conservatory in New York.

Career
Jones founded the record label Hot Tone Music in 2009.

References

External links
 
 Hot Tone Music

American bandleaders
American session musicians
Living people
Musicians from Jersey City, New Jersey
American women jazz musicians
Women bass guitarists
Guitarists from New Jersey
Guitarists from New York City
1972 births
Jazz musicians from New York (state)
21st-century American women musicians
21st-century American bass guitarists